Byeon Sangbyeok was an 18th century Korean painter of the Miryang Byeon clan during the late period of the Korean Joseon Dynasty (1392–1910). Byeon is famous for his precise depictions of animals and people in detailed brushwork.

Biography
His courtesy name (ja) is Wanbo and pen name (ho) is Hwajae. His birth and death dates are unknown, but was active in the mid 18th century during King Sukjong's (r. 1674–1720) and King Yeongjo's reign (r. 1724–1776). Byeon was praised for his excellent depictions of animals and people.  He served as a royal painter of Dohwaseo, the office of painting and then as a hyeongam, a magistrate of a small province. According to the book titled Jinhui sokgo (震彙續攷), Byeon Sangbyeok was especially excellent at depicting cats and chicken, so he gained nicknames like Byeon Goyang (trans. Byeon Cat)<ref>Yu, Hong-jun, [http://sjeas.skku.edu/upload/200605/06_Yu%20Hong-jun.pdf An Approach through the theory on Art to theory on Painting of Scholars of the Korean Practical Science"], Sungkyun Journal of East Asian Studies, Vol. 4, No. 1, 2004, p.126</ref> and Byeon Dak (Byeon Rooster). In addition, the book says that Byeon was famous for drawing portraits too, so he was also referred as Guksu (國手, a first class artisan) of the time, and his portrait works are over 100 pieces. Though, one of his extant portraits, the portrait of Yun Geup, an officer, does not show his excellent skills. He participated in drawing the portraits of King Yeongjo in 1763 and 1773.

Works
Byeon's representative works include "Myojakdo" (Painting of Cats and Sparrows) and "Gyejado" (Painting of a Chicken and Chicks). Myojakdo housed in the National Museum of Korea captures a lively scene of two cats and alarmed sparrows around a tree in detailed brushwork. The depiction of a group of chirping sparrows on twigs are illustrated precisely with very detailed brushstrokes. It is based on his deep affections toward animals and close observations in real life.

Gallery

See also
Korean painting
List of Korean painters
Korean art
Korean culture

References

 Citation 

 Sources 

An, Hwi-jun (1980), "Han'guk hoehwasa"'' (History of Korean painting), Ilchisa.

External links

Brief biography of Byeon Sangbyeok 
Byeon Sangbyeok Cats

18th-century Korean painters